John Michael David Robins (born 4 May 1982) is an English stand-up comedian and radio presenter.

Early life
Robins was born and grew up in Bristol and was educated at The Castle School in Thornbury, South Gloucestershire and at St Anne's College, Oxford, where he read English, having reapplied to Oxford after an initial unsuccessful application the previous year.

After graduating from Oxford, Robins returned to Bristol, where in 2006, he shared a flat with fellow comedians Jon Richardson, Russell Howard and Mark Olver.

Career
Robins began performing comedy in 2005, and soon reached the semi-finals of the So You Think You're Funny competition at the Edinburgh Festival Fringe. In 2007, he participated in the "Comedy Zone" showcase at the festival.

Robins appeared both as guest and as co-presenter on both The Russell Howard Show and The Jon Richardson Show on BBC 6 Music (2007–2010).

In 2011, Robins performed stand-up on Russell Howard's Good News. On television he has also appeared on Alan Davies: As Yet Untitled (twice, plus the unaired pilot), Live at the Apollo, Mock the Week, Live from the BBC, Celebrity Deal or No Deal with Sarah Millican and on the 2013 Christmas mash-up of 8 Out of 10 Cats and Deal or No Deal.

Robins also appeared on several radio programmes, including Matt Forde's Talksport show, BBC Radio 4's Word of Mouth and BBC Radio Wales's What's the Story?

In February 2014, he started hosting the Elis James and John Robins show on XFM (now Radio X) with fellow comedian Elis James. In August 2014, the show moved to Saturdays, and was broadcast weekly 1-4pm. It is also a popular podcast with over 12 million downloads as of July 2017.

Robins performed in New Zealand for the first time in May 2014 during the NZ International Comedy Festival, with the show Where Is My Mind?

In the second half of 2016, Robins embarked on a tour show with co-host Elis James called "The Elis James and John Robins Experience".

Robins has performed a solo show at the Edinburgh Festival every year between 2009 and 2015, starting with Skinny Love. His subsequent shows were Nomadic Revery (2010), Lift Your Skinny Fists Like Antennas to Heaven (2011), Incredible Scenes (2012), Where Is My Mind? (2013), This Tornado Loves You (2014) and Speakeasy (2015). All shows were also toured around the UK. He has also performed at the Machynlleth Comedy Festival and the Leicester Comedy Festival.

In August 2017, Robins won (jointly with Hannah Gadsby) the Edinburgh Comedy Award for his show that year, The Darkness of Robins, which focused on the breakdown of his relationship with comedian Sara Pascoe and his personal life after the break-up. It was the first time he had been nominated for the award. The show was later filmed by the BBC and eventually made available to watch on Netflix. Robins returned to Edinburgh in 2019 with the show Hot Shame.

In June 2018, it was announced that Robins would host a new upcoming game show for Dave entitled Beat the Internet. The show ran for 20 episodes and was not renewed for a second series. Also that year the duo published a book The Holy Vible.

In February 2019 Robins launched a YouTube channel called Bad Golf with friend and fellow comedian Alex Horne. As of November 2021, they have more than 50,000 subscribers. Following the popularity of the channel, Robins received a kit sponsorship, with Puma’s golf brand Cobra providing him with new clubs, bag and clothing.

After five years broadcasting on Radio X (previously XFM), the Elis James and John Robins show aired its final episode on the station on Saturday 30 March 2019. On 2 April 2019, Robins announced that he and Elis James would be hosting a new show on BBC Radio 5 Live. The BBC show has been broadcast since 31 May 2019, and all episodes are downloadable as podcasts.

In October 2019 Elis and John launched a new podcast How Do You Cope?...with Elis and John on BBC Radio 5 Live. It features Elis and John talking to celebrities about mental health issues they have faced.

Robins launched a new podcast in April 2021, The Moon Under Water, with fellow comedian and close friend Robin Allender. In each episode a guest will chat about their dream pub.

Awards and accolades 

 2015 Chortle Awards - Best Compère. 
 2017 Chortle Awards - Radio Award for Elis James and John Robins on Radio X
 2017 Edinburgh Comedy Award winner
 2020 Audio and Radio Industry Awards - Funniest Show for Elis James and John Robins
 2021 Broadcasting Press Guild Awards - Best Podcast for How Do You Cope?…with Elis and John

Personal life
In 2012, Robins moved to London.

Robins has described himself as "broadly vegan". He has also described himself as left-wing, and admires socialist Labour Party politicians Tony Benn and Dennis Skinner, though he has since clarified that he does not support far-left politics. He opposes Brexit.

Robins is a fan of the rock band Queen and supported them  at their 2014–15 New Year's Eve appearance. He is also a fan of Frank Zappa and  Bonnie "Prince" Billy and runs the Bonnie Prince Billy Quotes Twitter account. He has often named his Edinburgh shows after his favourite music, e.g. Lift Your Skinny Fists Like Antennas to Heaven is a Godspeed You! Black Emperor album, and "This Tornado Loves You" is a song by American singer-songwriter Neko Case.

Robins was for several years in a relationship with fellow comedian Sara Pascoe. They split in 2016, with both using their experience of the break-up and its consequences to create successful Edinburgh Fringe shows, Robins's winning the 2017 Edinburgh Comedy Award.

Starting in 2018, he was in a relationship with fashion designer Coco Fennell, sister of actress Emerald Fennell and daughter of jewellery designer Theo Fennell. Robins and Fennell became engaged in 2019. Robins confirmed on his Radio 5 Live show in December 2021 that the couple had split.

Robins is a keen golfer and posts regularly on YouTube under the Bad Golf channel. Robins is an experienced board game player, and once finished 11th in the British national Catan championships.

References

External links
 
 
 Elis James and John Robins (BBC Radio 5 Live)
 Bandcamp page which includes show recordings
 Youtube – Fringe Stories: John Robins (2013)

1982 births
Living people
BBC Radio 5 Live presenters
English male comedians
English stand-up comedians
British radio DJs
21st-century English comedians
Alumni of St Anne's College, Oxford
People educated at The Castle School